The U.S. Women's Chamber of Commerce was founded in 2001 to increase economic growth opportunities for women.  As the only national organization of its kind, the U.S. Women's Chamber of Commerce works in concert with its over 500,000 members, national and local association partners, and key influencers to open doors for women business owners and career professionals.

Focus

Key areas of focus for the U.S. Women's Chamber of Commerce include:  access to government contracting markets, access to capital for business start-up and growth, access to political office, access to education, and access to career promotions.  In each area, the U.S. Women's Chamber of Commerce works towards integrating women into the mainstream and providing access to economic advancement.

History

In 2005, the U.S. Women's Chamber of Commerce won a lawsuit against the U.S. Small Business Administration for failure to implement a law passed in 2000 to provide a targeted set-aside program for women-owned businesses seeking federal contracts.  This set-aside was established to help end the disparity in contracting faced by women.  Even though women own nearly 30 percent of all businesses in the United States, in 2007 they received only 3.41% of federal contracts.

In 2007, the U.S. Women's Chamber of Commerce filed an amicus brief in support of the women's class action suit against Walmart.

In 2008, Margot Dorfman, CEO of the U.S. Women's Chamber of Commerce, provided testimony before the Senate Committee on Health, Education, Labor and Pension in support of the Lilly Ledbetter Fair Pay Act of 2009.  Her testimony was cited by Sen. Patrick Leahy (D-VT) as follows:As the executive director of the U.S. Women's Chamber of Commerce recently noted, "The Fair Pay Restoration Act rewards those who play fair—including women business owners—unlike the Supreme Court's decision, which seems to give an unfair advantage to those who skirt the rules." This legislation will encourage all corporations to treat their employees fairly.Leaders and members of the U.S. Women's Chamber of Commerce are regularly called upon to testify before Congress on small business and economic issues.

On June 30, 2011, the Small Business Administration accepted the U.S. Women's Chamber of Commerce as an approved Third Party Certifier for the Women-Owned Small Business Contracting Program.  To further opportunities for women-owned small business federal contractors, the U.S. Women's Chamber of Commerce established the WOSB National Council.

In 2014, the U.S. Women's Chamber of Commerce established the I Vote for Women.org website to support the election of candidates supporting the chamber's women's economic priorities.

On September 11, 2014, the U.S. Women's Chamber of Commerce filed an amici curiae in support of Peggy Young for her case before the Supreme Court, Young v. UPS No. 12-1226, detailing the economic impact of women in the workforce.

On December 3, 2015, the U.S. Women's Chamber of Commerce announced their first ever presidential endorsement as they endorsed Secretary Hillary Clinton for the 2016 U.S. Presidential race. The chamber stated that the leadership examined the organization’s priorities along with the history, capability, commitments and electability of current presidential candidates in making the selection.

Association Members
The U.S. Women's Chamber of Commerce maintains a broad assortment of partners and association members including regional, national, and international organizations.

Alaska 8(a) Association
Arizona Small Business Association
Arizona Women Business Builders
Asian Women in Business
Association for Small Business and Technology
Association for Women in Architecture
Association of Procurement Technical Assistance Centers
Association of Small Business Development Centers
Association of Women Contractors
Business Women's Network of Howard County
Catalyst Women
Charo Community Development Corporation
Community Physical Therapists
Dress for Success - Washington DC
Financial Women International
Fort Worth Business Assistance Center
Girls in Government
Greater Cincinnati Women's Network
Hispanic Women's Corporation
Insight Center for Community Economic Development
Institute for Women's Policy Research
Latin Business Association
Michigan Association of Female Executives
National Association of Women in Construction
Minority/Women Business Enterprise Alliance, Inc.
National Center for American Indian Enterprise
National Center for Small Business Information
National Procurement Council
National Women's Political Caucus
Nebraska Women's Commission
New Jersey Association of Women Business Owners
Peninsula Tidewater Hispanic Chamber of Commerce
Professional Businesswomen of California
Professional Women in Construction
San Antonio Women's Chamber of Commerce
Society of Government Travel Professionals
Soroptimist International of the Americas
Tennessee Economic Council on Women
United for the Advancement of Women in the Construction Industry
University of Georgia SBDC
Women & Girls Foundation of SW PA
Women Business Owners of Montgomery County
Women Business Owners of Prince George's County
Women's Automotive Association International
Women's Business Council Gulf Coast
Women's Campaign Fund
Women's Chamber of Commerce of Palm Beach City
Women's Sports Foundation

References

External links
U.S. Women's Chamber of Commerce
USWCC Listing at the National Council of Women's Organizations
USWCC at Project Vote Smart

Women's rights organizations
Organizations established in 2001
American women in business
Chambers of commerce in the United States